V-League 2003 was the 47th season of Vietnam's professional football league, the V-League. PepsiCo was the league's sponsor, replacing Strata Sport Marketing.

Hoàng Anh Gia Lai won their first title in this season.

League table

External links
Vietnam Football Federation

Vietnamese Super League seasons
Vietnam
Vietnam
1